Passiflora ligularis, commonly known as the sweet granadilla or grenadia, is a plant species in the genus Passiflora. It is known as granadilla in Bolivia, Colombia, Nicaragua, Costa Rica, Ecuador, Mexico, The Azores, South Africa and Peru; granadilla común in Guatemala; granadilla de China or parcha dulce in Venezuela and granaditta in Jamaica.

Description
The epithet ligularis comes from the plant's ligulate corollae. It is native to the Andes Mountains, mainly Peru, including Bolivia, Costa Rica, Ecuador, Colombia and Venezuela. It grows as far south as northern Argentina and as far north as Mexico. Outside of its native range it grows in the tropical mountains of Africa and Australia (where they are known as passionfruit or Granadilla), and is now common in local markets of Papua New Guinea, where it is known as 'sugar fruit'. They have abundant, simple leaves and greenish-white flowers. The fruit is orange to yellow colored with small light markings. It has a round shape with a tip ending in the stem. The outer shell is hard and slippery, and has soft padding on the interior to protect the seeds. The seeds, which are hard and black, are surrounded by a gelatinous sphere of transparent pulp. The pulp is the edible part of the fruit and has a soft sweet taste. It is very aromatic and contains vitamins A, C, and K, phosphorus, iron, and calcium. The main importers are the United States, Canada, Belgium, the Netherlands, Switzerland, and Spain.

The stems scramble over the ground or clamber into the surrounding vegetation, attaching themselves by means of coiling tendrils.

References

External links

sweet granadilla image from Mundani Botanical Garden

ligularis
Crops originating from Ecuador
Edible fruits
Crops originating from Peru